Princess Olala (German: Prinzessin Olala) is a 1928 German silent drama film directed by Robert Land and starring Carmen Boni, Walter Rilla, Marlene Dietrich and Hans Albers. It is also known by the alternative title of Art of Love.

It was made at the Tempelhof Studios in Berlin. The film's sets were designed by the art director Robert Neppach.

Cast
 Hermann Böttcher as Der Fürst  
 Walter Rilla as Prince Boris, his son
 Georg Alexander as Der Kammerherr  
 Carmen Boni as Prinzessin Xenia  
 Illa Meery as Hedy, her friend  
 Marlene Dietrich as Chichotte de Gastoné  
 Hans Albers as René Chichotte's friend  
 Gyula Szőreghy as a strong man  
 Lya Christy as Lady Jackson  
 Aribert Wäscher as Police superintendent  
 Carl Goetz as an old cavalier
 Alfred Abel in an undefined role

References

Bibliography
 Wood, Ean. Divine Dietrich: Venus in Tails. Sanctuary, 2002.

External links

1928 films
Films of the Weimar Republic
Films directed by Robert Land
German silent feature films
German drama films
1928 drama films
Films with screenplays by Franz Schulz
Films based on operettas
Films shot at Tempelhof Studios
German black-and-white films
Silent drama films
1920s German films